The City of Mackay was a local government area located in the Central Queensland region of Queensland, Australia, encompassing the regional city of Mackay and the surrounding region. The City was created as a municipal borough in 1869, and prior to amalgamation with the Shire of Pioneer in 1994, the City was limited to the central suburbs on the south shore of the Pioneer River. In 2008, it amalgamated with the Shires of Mirani and Sarina to become the Mackay Regional Council.

History
The Borough of Mackay was proclaimed on 22 September 1869 under the Municipal Institutions Act 1864. The Pioneer Division was established on 11 November 1879 as one of 74 founding divisions under the Divisional Boards Act 1879.

Initially the council meetings were held in the Court House in River Street, the Post and Telegraph office in Wood Street, and in a building on Sydney Street owned by Mr R. Fleming. The first town hall was a timber structure constructed in 1872 on land that the council purchased at 63 Sydney Street.

With the passage of the Local Authorities Act 1902, Pioneer Division became the Shire of Pioneer and Mackay became Town of Mackay on 31 March 1903. Mackay received City status on 17 August 1918.

During the boom in sugar prices, the borough council decided in 1884 that a larger town hall was needed. However, it was not until 1909 that they decided to proceed with a brick building on the site of the existing town hall in Sydney Street. The council held a design competition, which was won by a local architect and engineer Arthur Rigby. The first town hall was moved to the rear of the block to be behind the new building. The first official Council meeting was held in the (now heritage-listed) second town hall on 19 October 1912 with the official opening the next day.

After the council moved into their new Civic Administration Centre in 1974, they proposed to demolish the town hall and sell off the land to defray the costs of the new civic centre. However, following public protest, they renovated the building to make it available for community purposes.

On 21 November 1991, the Electoral and Administrative Review Commission, created two years earlier, produced its second report, and recommended that local government boundaries in the Mackay area be rationalised. The Local Government (Mackay and Pioneer) Regulation 1993 was gazetted on 17 December 1993, and on 30 March 1994, the two amalgamated into a larger City of Mackay, which first met on 8 April 1994.

On 15 March 2008, under the Local Government (Reform Implementation) Act 2007 passed by the Parliament of Queensland on 10 August 2007, the City of Mackay merged with the Shires of Mirani and Sarina to form the Mackay Regional Council.

Towns and localities
Prior to 1994, Mackay consisted of the suburbs of North Mackay, West Mackay, South Mackay and East Mackay.

All other suburbs of Mackay belonged into the defunct Shire of Pioneer.

After the amalgamation, the City of Mackay included the following settlements:

Suburbs:
 Mackay:
 North Mackay
 East Mackay
 West Mackay
 South Mackay
 Andergrove
 Beaconsfield
 Blacks Beach
 Bucasia
 Cremorne
 Dolphin Heads
 Eimeo
 Erakala
 Foulden
 Glenella
 Mackay Harbour
 Mount Pleasant
 Nindaroo
 Ooralea
 Paget
 Racecourse
 Richmond
 Rural View
 Shoal Point
 Slade Point
 Te Kowai

Towns:
 Bakers Creek
 Ball Bay
 Brampton Island
 Calen
 Dalrymple Bay
 Farleigh
 Halliday Bay
 Hampden
 Kuttabul
 Laguna Quays
 Lindeman Island
 McEwens Beach
 Midge Point
 Mount Ossa
 Oakenden
 Pindi Pindi
 Seaforth
 St Helens Beach
 Walkerston
National Parks:
 Cape Hillsborough NP
 Eungella NP
 Mount Jukes NP
 Mount Martin NP
 Mount Ossa NP
 Pioneer Peaks NP
 Reliance Creek NP

Other localities:
 Alexandra
 Balberra
 Balnagowan
 Belmunda
 Bloomsbury
 Chelona
 Dumbleton
 Dunnrock
 Greenmount
 Habana
 Homebush
 Mentmore
 Mount Charlton
 Mount Pelion
 Palmyra
 Pleystowe
 Rosella
 Sandiford
 Sunnyside
 The Leap
 Victoria Plains
 Yalboroo

Mayors
 1869-1871: David Hay Dalrymple
 1872: Alexander Shiels
 1873: George Smith
 1873-1874: David Hay Dalrymple (second term) 
 1875-1876: George Smith
 1876-1877: Korah H. Wills
 1878: William Marsh
 1879:Charles R. Dutallis
 1880: William Paxton
 1881: George Smith (second term)
 1882: Edmund S. Rawson
 1883: Thomas Pearce
 1884: Michael J. Fay
 1885: John Harney
 1886: George Dimmock
 1887: Archibald McIntyre
 1888: Henry Lindesay Black
 1889: W. Robertson
 1890: W.G. Hodges
 1891: W.J. Byrne
 1891: Henry B. Black
 1892: Alexander Pine
 1893:N.C. Morthensen
 1894: G. Dimmock
 1895: Henry B. Black
 1895/6?: P.M. Hynes
 1896: W.G. Hodges
 1897: Henry B. Black
 1898: J.H. Thornber
 1899: Samuel Lambert
 1900: C. Morley
 1901: W.G. Hodges
 1902: Cecil Garcia Smith
 1903: C.P. Ready
 1904-1906: T.D. Chataway
 1907: Alexander J. McLean
 1908: C.R. Klugh
 1909: E.J. Marryatt
 1910-1911: James Christie
 1912: Hans Ditley Petersen
 1913: C.P. Ready
 1914-1915: George B. Fay
 1916: V. Macrossan
 1917-1918: James Prout Moule (died 1 June 1918)
 1918: William Crawford Weir (resigned to become Town Clerk in November 1918)
 1918: Robert Hague
 1919: Arthur Hucker
 1920: George M. Cameron
 1921-1924: A.F. Williams
 1924-1927?: George A. Milton
 1924–1927?: Lewis Windermere Nott
 1927-1930: George A. Milton 
 1930-1933: Ian A.C. Wood
 1933-1934: J.M. Mulherin
 1934-1939: George Moody
 1939-1952: Ian A.C. Wood
 1952-1967: John (Jack) Binnington
 1967-1970: Ian A.C. Wood
 1970-1988: Albert F. Abbott
 1988-1991: Peter J. Jardine
 1991-1994: Gregory R. Williamson
Amalgamation of Mackay City and Pioneer Shire Councils
 1994–1997: Gordon White, prior to the amalgamation with Pioneer Shire, White had been chairman of the Pioneer Shire Council (1983–1994)
 1997-2008: Julie Boyd
Amalgamation of Mackay City Sarina Shire and Mirani Shire Councils
 2008-2012: Colin Meng
 2012-2016: Dierdre Comerford
 2016 -   : Gregory R. Williamson

Town Clerks 
The town clerks of the City of Mackay were:
 1869-1871: Thomas Purves
 1871-1872: M.J. Fay
 1872: R.W. Smith
 1872: A.M. Rheuben
 1872: J. Rutherford
 1872-1873: A.M Rheuben
 1873-1875: H.F. Morgan
 1876-1881: J.C. Binney
 1881-1883 : F.N. Beddek
 1883-1886: W.G. Hodges
 1886-1890: C. Davie
 1891: G. Dimmock
 1892-1895: C. Davie
 1895-1901: G. Dimmock
 1902: James H. Tornber (died 29 December 1902)
 1903-1915: Fred Morley
 1916-1918: Arthur Fadden
 1918-1943: William Crawford Weir
 1944-1957: S. Murray
 1957-1980: L.A. Payne
 1980-1994: S.B. Fursman
 1994-1997: T.P. Crompton
 1997-before 2000: R.C. Bain
 before 2000-before 2004: J. Harris
 before 2004-2008: K. Gouldthorp

Transport
 Mackay Airport
 North Coast railway line, Mackay Station
 Bruce Highway

Sister cities
 Matsuura, Japan (Nagasaki Prefecture)

Population

References

Mackay, Queensland
Former local government areas of Queensland
2008 disestablishments in Australia
Populated places disestablished in 2008